The Bhutan men's national volleyball team represents Bhutan in international volleyball competitions. It is managed by the Bhutan Volleyball Federation.

The national team of Bhutan competes in the South Asian Games. 

Volleyball isn't as popular as Football in Bhutan, but some Bhutanese enjoy playing the game. The federation meanwhile is struggling to promote the game in the country due to lack of funds. 

Although the game is an indoor sport by nature, all of the games organized by the Federation are played outside. This is because the federation does not have an indoor court yet. Despite the rain, scorching sun and wind, tournaments are conducted in the open space at the Changlimithang in Thimphu.

References

Volleyball in Bhutan
National men's volleyball teams
volleyball
Men's sport in Bhutan